The Navarro County Courthouse is a historic courthouse in Corsicana, Texas, U.S.. It was designed in the Beaux Arts style by architect James E. Flanders, and completed in 1905 for $128,000. A "four-sided clock was added to the tower in 1923." It was "partially restored" in 2013.

The building has been listed on the National Register of Historic Places since September 10, 2004.

See also

National Register of Historic Places listings in Navarro County, Texas
List of county courthouses in Texas
Recorded Texas Historic Landmarks in Navarro County

References

External links

Courthouses on the National Register of Historic Places in Texas
Beaux-Arts architecture in Texas
Government buildings completed in 1905
Buildings and structures in Navarro County, Texas
1905 establishments in Texas